Gov. Lucas Nogueira Garcez Airport  is the airport serving Lins, Brazil.

It is operated by the Municipality of Lins.

History
In 2013 the administration of the airport was transferred to the Municipality of Lins. Previously it was administrated by DAESP.

Airlines and destinations
No scheduled flights operate at this airport.

Access

See also

List of airports in Brazil

References

External links

Airports in São Paulo (state)